Myron Field is an American bridge player.

Bridge accomplishments

Wins

 North American Bridge Championships (4)
 Reisinger (1) 1950 
 Spingold (2) 1951, 1955 
 Vanderbilt (1) 1941

Runners-up

 Bermuda Bowl (1) 1956 
 North American Bridge Championships (9)
 Masters Individual (1) 1948 
 Chicago Mixed Board-a-Match (1) 1951 
 Reisinger (1) 1951 
 Spingold (2) 1939, 1940 
 Vanderbilt (3) 1949, 1950, 1953 
 von Zedtwitz Life Master Pairs (1) 1940

Notes

American contract bridge players
Bermuda Bowl players